John Joseph Murphy (September 24, 1922  - December 15, 2010 ) was a businessman and politician, and the 11th mayor of St. John's, Newfoundland, Canada.

Born the son of John Murphy and Gertrude Wadden in St. John's, Newfoundland, he was educated at Saint Bonaventure's College. He worked for a time as a radio announcer with VOCM, but, following his 1951 marriage to Marjorie Halley, joined Halley and Company, a dry goods wholesale and retail firm.

Following the death of his father-in-law, Patrick Halley, in 1956, Murphy became president of the company and expanded its retail chain, The Arcade, to nine stores in the St. John's and Conception Bay South region. As of 1990, only two of the stores were still operating.

Murphy ran unsuccessfully as a Liberal candidate in the 1966 provincial election and again in a by-election in 1970. Elected to St. John's City council in 1973, he became deputy mayor. In 1977, he ran unsuccessfully against incumbent mayor Dorothy Wyatt, but defeated her in 1981. He won by acclamation in 1985, did not run in the 1990 election, but was elected for again in 1993, and retired from city politics in 1997 after losing his bid for re-election as Mayor.

During his tenure on council Murphy was successful in restoring downtown residential properties by lobbying federal and provincial governments for home improvement funds. The city also began a housing program which won several national awards. In 1990 Murphy tried to convince the provincial government to expand the city's boundaries to include Mount Pearl, Paradise, Conception Bay South and Wedgewood Park.

On June 24, 1985, Murphy was appointed a Member of the Order of Canada and in May 2005, Murphy received the honorary degree of Doctor of Laws, honoris causa from the Memorial University of Newfoundland.

References

1922 births
Businesspeople from St. John's, Newfoundland and Labrador
Canadian people of Irish descent
2010 deaths
Mayors of St. John's, Newfoundland and Labrador
Members of the Order of Canada